Maihua is a variety of Chinese of uncertain affiliation spoken in the area of 崖县 Yáxiàn (Sanya) in southern Hainan, China. It was classified as Yue in the Language Atlas of China, but that is no longer certain. There are about 15,000 speakers of Maihua in southern Hainan.

Classification 
Jiang et al. (2007) considers Maihua to be a mix of Yue Chinese, Hakka-Gan, and Hainanese Min.

Distribution 
Maihua is spoken in the following areas.
 Yanglan Village (羊栏村), Fenghuang Town (凤凰镇), originally called Yanglan Town 羊栏镇), in the northwestern part of Sanya City (5,000 speakers)
 Linjia Village (林家村) and Miaoshan Village (妙山村) of Miaolin Township (妙林乡, 6,000 speakers)
 Shuinan Village (水南村), Gongbei Village (拱北村), etc., in Yacheng Town (崖城镇), western Sanya City (三亚市, about 1,000 speakers)

The Utsat language is spoken just to the west of the Maihua area. Just to the southwest is Haibo Village (海波村), where Danzhouhua (儋州话) is spoken.

References 

 
 海南岛的"迈话"--一种混合型方言

Varieties of Chinese